The Nursery Stakes/Handicap was an American Thoroughbred horse race run in New York State for the first time on October 1, 1866 at Jerome Park Racetrack. Following the closure of that track after New York City had announced its decision to build the Jerome Park Reservoir on the property, the race was taken over by the Morris Park Racecourse. When that track closed after the 1904 running, it was transferred to Belmont Park where it would remain until its final running on September 27, 1938.

Historical notes
The 1866 inaugural running of the Nursery Stakes was won by the filly Ruthless owned by Francis Morris whose son John would own the Morris Park Racecourse. The following year Ruthless would win the first edition of the Belmont Stakes, a race that would become the third leg of the U.S. Triple Crown series, ensuring her induction into the U.S. Racing Hall of Fame. Through 2020, Ruthless, Tanya (1905), and Rags to Riches (2007) are the only fillies to ever win the Belmont Stakes.

Locations
 1866 - 1889: Jerome Park
 1890 - 1904: Morris Park
 1905 - 1938: Belmont Park

Distances
 1 mile 1866 - 1876
 3/4 mile 1877 - 1938

Records
Speed record:
 1:10.00 @ 6 furlongs: Dauber (1937)

Most wins by a jockey:
 2 - Willie Simms (1893, 1895)
 2 - John McTaggart (1915, 1916)

Most wins by a trainer:
 4 - Jim McLaughlin  (1902, 1903, 1904, 1909)

Most wins by an owner:
 2 - John E. Madden (1897, 1924)
 2 - Roslyn Dorothy McLaughlin (1904, 1909)
 2 - Harry Payne Whitney (1905, 1919)
 2 - Greentree Stable (1922, 1927)
 2 - Belair Stud Stable (1931, 1938)

Winners (1891-1938)

References

1866 establishments in New York (state)
Jerome Park Racetrack
Morris Park Racecourse
Belmont Park
Flat horse races for two-year-olds
Discontinued horse races in New York (state)
Recurring sporting events established in 1866